Boomer Township is a township in Pottawattamie County, Iowa, USA.

History
Boomer Township was established in 1858. It was named for a man named Bloomer, but the judge omitted the L.

References

Townships in Pottawattamie County, Iowa
Townships in Iowa